Kyungsung University is a private university in Busan, South Korea.  It is located in the district of Nam-gu, southwest of the famous Haeundae beach.  The campus is located near Kyungsung University-Pukyong National University Station on Line 2.

The university was established by the late Reverend Dr. Kim Gil-Chang, a pioneer of Christianity in Korea. The university was originally called Kyungnam Teacher's College and established in 1955 under the ideals of Christian love and service, In 1979 the school was re-organized and renamed Pusan Industrial University. At the time of the founding of Pusan Industrial University, the General Construction Committee began work on expanding and improving the quality of the university's facilities. As a result, the university received official sanctioning as a general university in September, 1983.

The name of the university was changed to Kyungsung University in 1988 during the process of becoming an international university which can fulfill the needs of today's society.

The university has 10 undergraduate colleges (Liberal Arts, Law and Politics, Commerce and Economics, Science, Engineering, Pharmacy, Arts, Theology, Multimedia, and Chinese) encompassing 7 different faculties and 54 departments at the time of 2011.
There are seven graduate schools (General, International Management, Multimedia, Education, Social Welfare, Clinical Pharmacy, and Digital Design). In addition, seven affiliated organizations and seven affiliated research institutes have been established to aid teaching and research. Kyungsung University's 700 employees and over 13,000 students are all working together to achieve the school's educational goals.

Since 2002, the university has held a regional conference between South Korea and China regarding sustainable development of the Northeast Asia region.

The Kyungsung University Museum has been involved in the excavation of important regional archaeological sites. In the 1990s, the university museum was responsible for excavating the Daeseong-dong site, a protohistoric cemetery Gimhae with high-status burials from the Proto–Three Kingdoms Period.

Notable alumni
 Cho Jae-hyun, actor
 Cho Jin-woong, actor
 Kim Hyun-sook, actress
 Kim Jung-tae, actor

External links
 Korean version of University's website
 English version of University's website
 DIGITAL KYUNGSUNG (Kyungsung Univ. Online Newspaper)

Universities and colleges in Busan